Wise guy or Wiseguy may refer to:

Film and TV
 Wiseguy (TV series), a US television series
 The Wise Guy, a 1926 silent crime drama film directed by Frank Lloyd
 The Wise Guys, a 1965 French comedy film directed by Robert Enrico
 Wise Guys (1961 film), directed by Claude Chabrol
 Wise Guys (1986 film), directed by Brian de Palma
 Wise Guys, upcoming film directed by Barry Levinson

Music
 Wise Guys (band), a German a cappella group
 The Wiseguys, a British electronica hip hop band
 "Wise Guy", a 1998 song by Joe Pesci, from the album Vincent LaGuardia Gambini Sings Just for You
 Wise Guys (album), a 1998 album by Ghetto Commission
 Tropical Gangsters, a 1982 album by Kid Creole and the Coconuts, released in the US as Wise Guy

Other
 Wise Guy (musical), an unproduced musical by Irving Berlin
 Wise Guys, a Stephen Sondheim musical later renamed Road Show
 Wiseguy (The Simpsons), a fictional character on The Simpsons
 Wiseguy (book), a 1986 nonfiction book by Nicholas Pileggi that was the basis for the film Goodfellas
 Made man, an official member of the mafia

See also
Wise man
Smart aleck (disambiguation)